The East Derwent Highway (route number B32) is a highway in Hobart, Tasmania, Australia. The highway is a trunk road that carries heavy commuter traffic, much like the Brooker Highway, on the eastern side of the River Derwent.

Route
The highway starts at the roundabout with Midland Highway at Bridgewater and heads south as a dual-lane, single carriageway road, connecting with the Bowen Bridge over the River Derwent, widening to a four-lane, dual-carriageway road through Risdon, narrowing again to a dual-lane, single-carriageway road through Geilston Bay, and then widening to a four-lane, single-carriageway road to eventually terminate at the Lindisfarne Interchange at Rose Bay, near the eastern side of the Tasman Bridge leading into central Hobart.

Exits and intersections

See also 

 Highways in Australia
 List of highways in Tasmania

References

External links

Highways in Hobart